Zwicknia is a genus of small winter stoneflies in the family Capniidae. There are about 11 described species in Zwicknia.

Species
These 11 species belong to the genus Zwicknia:
 Zwicknia acuta Murányi & Orci, 2014
 Zwicknia bifrons (Newman, 1838)
 Zwicknia gattolliati Vinçon & Reding, 2018
 Zwicknia komica Murányi & Boumans, 2014
 Zwicknia kovacsi Murányi & Gamboa, 2014
 Zwicknia ledoarei Reding, Launay, Ruffoni, Vinçon & Boumans, 2016
 Zwicknia rupprechti Murányi, Orci & Gamboa, 2014
 Zwicknia sevanica (Zhiltzova, 1964)
 Zwicknia tuberculata (Zhiltzova, 1964)
 Zwicknia turkestanica (Kimmins, 1950)
 Zwicknia westermanni Boumans & Murányi, 2014

References

Further reading

External links

 

Plecoptera